My Michael (translit. Michael Sheli) is a 1974 Israeli drama film directed by Dan Wolman, who co-wrote the screenplay. The film is based on the 1968 novel by Amos Oz. The film was released in the U.S. in 1976.

At the annual Kinor David awards ceremony, the film won in the categories of best director, best screenplay, best actor, and best actress. It was also selected as the Israeli entry for Best Foreign Language Film for the 48th Academy Awards, but was not accepted as a nominee.

Cast
 Oded Kotler as Michael Gonan
 Efrat Lavie as Hanna Gonen
 Ruth Farhi 
 Moti Mizrahi
 Dina Roitkoff

See also
 List of submissions to the 48th Academy Awards for Best Foreign Language Film
 List of Israeli submissions for the Academy Award for Best Foreign Language Film

References

External links
 

1974 films
1974 drama films
1970s Hebrew-language films
Films directed by Dan Wolman
Israeli drama films